The Emme is a river in Switzerland. It rises in the Alps between the peaks of Hohgant and Augstmatthorn in the canton of Bern.

The Emme is known for its sudden variations in water discharge. The narration Die Wassernot im Emmental (The Water Crisis in the Emmen Valley) by Jeremias Gotthelf impressively describes a very large and destructive, and therefore well-known, flood which occurred August 13, 1837. This and other floods led to the building of numerous canals and dams in the 19th century.

The tributaries of the Emme are the Ilfis and the Limpach.

See also
Emmental
Kleine Emme

Rivers of Switzerland
Rivers of the canton of Bern